UNSA may refer to:

Universities
 Universitas Surakarta, Surakarta, Indonesia
 Université de Nice Sophia Antipolis, Nice, France
 National University of St Augustin of Arequipa (Universidad Nacional de San Agustín de Arequipa), Arequipa, Peru
 University of Sarajevo, Bosnia and Herzegovina
 National University of Salta (Universidad Nacional de Salta, UNSa), Salta, Argentina 
 University of Newcastle Students' Association, Australia

Other
 Union nationale des syndicats autonomes, a French trade union
 UNSA Stadium, Arequipa, Peru
 United Nations Space Alliance, a faction in Call of Duty: Infinite Warfare